Wiener Stadthalle (English: Viennese City Hall) is a multi-purpose indoor arena and convention center located in the 15th district of Vienna, Austria. Austrian architect Roland Rainer designed the original halls which were constructed between 1953 and 1958, and later expanded in 1974, 1994 and 2006. The main hall, a multi-purpose venue, is Austria's largest indoor arena with a seating capacity of approximately 16,152 people.

Since 2006, the complex has housed six main venues (each of which can be used separately or combined) consisting of two gymnasiums, an indoor ice rink, large-capacity indoor arena, a small multi-purpose hall, an auditorium with a show stage, and an adjacent swimming pool. It serves as a venue for a variety of events, including concerts, exhibitions, trade fairs, conferences, lectures, theatre, TV and sports.

The Wiener Stadthalle is a subsidiary of Wien Holding and stages more than 350 events each year that attract around one million visitors. Halls A, B and C, as well as the Stadthallenbad, are managed by the Viennese sports venues corporation GmbH.

History of events

The arena has been site of the annual Erste Bank Open tennis tournament since 1974 and has hosted the ice shows Vienna Ice Revue and Holiday on Ice, the touring horse show Apassionata annually and the circus show Artisten-Tiere-Attraktionen from 1959 to 1995.

The Stadthalle has also hosted a number of sporting events including the 1970 European Athletics Indoor Championships, the 2004 European Short Course Swimming Championships, the 2010 and 2020 European Men's Handball Championship, the 2011 Men's European Volleyball Championship, the Austrian International open badminton tournament and the Ice Hockey World Championships in 1967, 1977, 1987, 1996 and 2005.

Austrian broadcaster ORF announced on August 6, 2014, that Stadthalle would be the host venue for the Eurovision Song Contest 2015, following the victory of Conchita Wurst in the 2014 Final in Copenhagen, Denmark. The arena hosted the 60th contest in the main hall; the semi-finals were held on May 19 and 21 and the grand final was held on the night of May 23, 2015, where Måns Zelmerlöw won the contest for Sweden.

Building

The complex comprises 6 interconnecting halls: A and B (gymnasiums built in 1957, which can also be used for conferences or lectures), C (indoor ice rink), D (indoor arena, mostly for concerts or sport), E (small multi-purpose hall for smaller events) and F (arena hall for more intimate concerts).

Halls A and B
Halls A and B were completed in 1957 as a gymnasium and sports hall. Both halls can also be used for conferences or lectures. The basement of Hall A houses training rooms and the lower level of Hall B contains bowling lanes and dressing rooms.

Hall C
Hall C, completed in 1958, houses an ice rink  and is operated by Die EisStadthalle.

Hall D
Completed in 1958, the large multi-purpose main hall is Austria's largest indoor arena. It has a capacity of up to 16,152 depending on the event. The venue has special curtain systems and ground-level stands on the north and south sides of the hall which can be fully closed to divide the hall into several parts.

Hall E
The small multi-purpose hall was completed in 1994 and holds up to 1,482.

Hall F
Conceived as an arena hall, Hall F was completed in 2006 and holds up to 2,036 visitors in raked theatre seating. The hall has a built-in catwalk and an audio and video system.

Stadthallenbad
In 1974, the additional Stadthallenbad and three public swimming pools, were constructed.

Entertainment

Gallery

See also
 List of tennis stadiums by capacity
 List of indoor arenas in Austria

References

External links

Official website
Die EisStadthalle

Sports venues in Vienna
Tennis venues in Austria
Indoor arenas in Austria
Music venues in Austria
Handball venues in Austria
Indoor track and field venues
Buildings and structures in Rudolfsheim-Fünfhaus
Sports venues completed in 1957
1957 establishments in Austria
20th-century architecture in Austria